Description of a Struggle is a collection of short stories and story fragments by Franz Kafka. First published in 1936 after Kafka's death by Max Brod, it was translated by Tania and James Stern and published in 1958 by Schocken Books.

Contents
 Description of a Struggle
 Blumfeld, an Elderly Bachelor
 The Warden of the Tomb
 The Refusal
 Short pieces:
 Poseidon
 The Vulture
 The Departure
 Give It Up!
 At Night
 The Helmsman
 The Top
 The Test
 Advocates
 Home-Coming
 Fellowship
 Fragments of A Report to an Academy
 Fragment of The Great Wall of China
 The Conscription of Troops
 Fragment of The Hunter Gracchus

Printings
Kafka, Franz. Description of a Struggle. New York: Schocken Books, 1958.

See also
Franz Kafka

References

1958 short story collections
Short story collections by Franz Kafka
Books published posthumously
Schocken Books books